Andreas Birnbacher (born 11 September 1981) is a former German biathlete. His biggest successes were the silver medal in the mass start event at the 2007 World Championships and the gold medal in the mixed relay at the 2008 World Championships. He also won the bronze medal at the 2012 world championships in Ruhpolding when he was part of the German teams that finished third in the mixed relay and the men's relay.

Life and career

2011–2012 world cup season
Birnbacher's most successful biathlon world cup season was the 2011–2012 season. He had just come off the back of a strong end to the 2010/2011 season after taking his maiden win in the Oslo sprint. In the opening world cup race at Östersund, he finished 28th in the individual competition but placed 6th in the sprint and pursuit. Birnbacher's first win of the year came in the Hochfilzen (2) pursuit when he came through from 26th to win, hitting the perfect 20/20 score and denying Ole Einar Bjørndalen in a sprint finish. For Birnbacher, this win was the last race before the Christmas break.

Returning from the break, Birnbacher looked extremely strong in Oberhof. After a poor 24th in the sprint, he ran away with the mass start, hitting all 20 targets and finishing 24.3 seconds ahead of his nearest challenger. This victory completed a rout of the top step of the podium for Germany after Magdalena Neuner won both women's races and Arnd Peiffer won the men's sprint.

Birnbacher's strongest weekend of the season was Antholz-Anterselva. After finishing 4th in the sprint, he took win number 3 in the mass start with a penalty lap on shoot 3 proving to be a mere bump on the road to victory as he beat Anton Shipulin and Martin Fourcade by 0.1 and 0.3 seconds respectively. At that point in the season, Birnbacher sat 52 points off Fourcade and 27 pts behind Emil Hegle Svendsen of Norway.

World cup 7 took Birnbacher back to the site of his maiden win at the end of last year: Oslo Hollmenkollen. After reasonable sprint and pursuit performances Birnbacher, finished second in the mass start cleaning all 20 targets but not having the skiing speed of race winner Svendsen. Then any hopes of Birnbacher taking the overall crystal globe ended when the German coaches decided to rest him for Kontiolathi Finland so he could be prepared for the upcoming world championships.

The world championships were a mixed bag for Birnbacher. He won two bronze medals and finished 4th in the individual and mass start events. In the mixed relay, Birnbacher teamed up with Andrea Henkel, Magdalena Neuner and Arnd Peiffer; at the time the four of them combined had won 14 races. Birnbacher looked to have given Germany the win as he made no mistakes on the shooting range and the net result was a 1-minute advantage for Germany. Then Peiffer had a penalty loop on the standing shoot and Germany finished 3rd.  His other medal came in the men's relay once again he teamed up with Peiffer but also with Simon Schempp and the returning Michael Greis. Birnbacher needed 2 spare rounds for the standing shoot but his strong skiing kept Germany in the running for Medals. The two bronze medals meant that for the first time in his career Birnbacher had picked up more than one medal from the world championships.

In the last race of the season, a 4th-place finish in the mass start meant Birnbacher clinched the mass start crystal globe thus picking up the German men's first Crystal globe since Michael Greis won the overall and sprint crystal globes in 2007. Birnbacher finished the year third overall on 837 points.

Retirement
Birnbacher announced his retirement on 8 March 2016 during the World Championships in Oslo. His last race was the 20 km individual on 10 March.

Biathlon results
All results are sourced from the International Biathlon Union.

Olympic Games

*The mixed relay was added as an event in 2014.

World Championships
6 medals (1 gold, 1 silver, 4 bronze)

*During Olympic seasons competitions are only held for those events not included in the Olympic program.
**The mixed relay was added as an event in 2005.

World Cup

Individual victories
6 victories (2 Sp, 1 Pu, 3 MS)

*Results are from UIPMB and IBU races which include the Biathlon World Cup, Biathlon World Championships and the Winter Olympic Games.

References

External links

  
 

1981 births
Living people
German male biathletes
Biathletes at the 2010 Winter Olympics
Biathletes at the 2014 Winter Olympics
Olympic biathletes of Germany
Biathlon World Championships medalists
Holmenkollen Ski Festival winners
21st-century German people